The Humming Bird (also known as Les loups de Montmartre) is a 1924 American silent crime drama film directed by Sidney Olcott and starring Gloria Swanson. Produced by Famous Players-Lasky and distributed by Paramount Pictures, the film is based on the play of the same name by Maude Fulton, who also starred in the Broadway production.

Plot
As described in a film magazine review, Toinette, alias "The Humming Bird" and member of the Apaches, commits many successful robberies in Paris while disguised as a young man. She falls in love with Randall Carey, an American newspaper correspondent. Randall joins the army when war breaks out. Toinette persuades her Apache confederate to enlist. She is jailed, but escapes during a Zeppelin bombardment and joins her wounded lover at his aunt's residence. The authorities pardon her and she finds happiness with Randall.

Cast

Production
The film was shot at the Kaufman Astoria Studios in Queens.

Preservation
A print of The Humming Bird is housed at the Library of Congress and the Nederlands Filmmuseum.

References

External links

Lobby card and still at silenthollywood.com
 The Humming Bird at website dedicated to Sidney Olcott
Long poster; probably an Australian daybill

1924 films
1924 crime drama films
American crime drama films
American silent feature films
American black-and-white films
Famous Players-Lasky films
American films based on plays
Films directed by Sidney Olcott
Films shot in New York City
Paramount Pictures films
Films shot at Astoria Studios
1920s American films
Silent American drama films